Acroceras is a genus of tropical and subtropical plants in the grass family.

The genus is widespread across warmer parts of Asia, Africa, and the Americas, with a high amount of diversity in Madagascar.

 Species

 formerly included
see Brachiaria Panicum 
 Acroceras paucispicatum - Brachiaria paucispicata
 Acroceras pilgerianum - Panicum pilgerianum

See also
 List of Poaceae genera

References

External links
 

Panicoideae
Poaceae genera